Negus Mine was a gold producer at Yellowknife, Northwest Territories, Canada, from 1939 to 1952. It produced 255,807 troy ounces (7956 kg) of gold from 490,808 tons of ore milled. The underground workings were acquired by adjacent Con Mine in 1953 and were used for ventilation purposes until Con Mine closed in 2003.

References

Gold mines in the Northwest Territories
Underground mines in Canada
Former mines in Canada